Nebria fasciatopunctata is a species of ground beetle in the Nebriinae subfamily that can be found in Austria, Croatia, and Slovenia.

References

External links
Nebria fasciatopunctata at Carabidae of the World

fasciatopunctata
Beetles described in 1850
Beetles of Europe